The 2022–23 CAF Champions League group stage began on 10 February and will end on 1 April 2023. A total of 16 teams are competing in the group stage to decide the eight places in the knockout stage of the 2022–23 CAF Champions League.

Draw
The draw for the group stage was held on 12 December 2022, 12:00 GMT (14:00 local time, UTC+2), at the CAF headquarters in Cairo, Egypt. The 16 winners of the second round of qualifying were drawn into four groups of four.

The teams were seeded by their performances in the CAF competitions for the previous five seasons (CAF 5-Year Ranking points shown next to every team). Each group contained one team from each of Pot 1, Pot 2, Pot 3, and Pot 4, and each team was allocated to the positions in their group according to their pot.

Format
In the group stage, each group is played on a home-and-away round-robin basis. The winners and runners-up of each group will advance to the quarter-finals of the knockout stage.

Tiebreakers
The teams are ranked according to points (3 points for a win, 1 point for a draw, 0 points for a loss). If tied on points, tiebreakers are applied in the following order (Regulations III. 20 & 21):
Points in head-to-head matches among tied teams;
Goal difference in head-to-head matches among tied teams;
Goals scored in head-to-head matches among tied teams;
Away goals scored in head-to-head matches among tied teams;
If more than two teams are tied, and after applying all head-to-head criteria above, a subset of teams are still tied, all head-to-head criteria above are reapplied exclusively to this subset of teams;
Goal difference in all group matches;
Goals scored in all group matches;
Away goals scored in all group matches;
Drawing of lots.

Schedule
The schedule of each matchday is as follows.

Groups
Times are local.

Group A

Group B

Group C

Group D

Notes

References

External links
CAFonline.com

2
February 2023 sports events in Africa
March 2023 sports events in Africa
April 2023 sports events in Africa